Holmstrup is a village, with a population of 224 (1 January 2022), to the southwest of  Odense, in Funen, Denmark.

References

Suburbs of Odense
Populated places in Funen